The Battle of Serravalle took place on 2–4 June 1544 in Serravalle Scrivia, in the Apennine Mountains, between the Imperial-Spanish army commanded by Don Alfonso d'Avalos, Marquis del Vasto, and a force of freshly raised Italian mercenaries in French service, led by Pietro Strozzi, member of the rich and famous Florentine family of the Strozzi, and Giovan Francesco Orsini, Count of Pitigliano, during the Italian War of 1542–1546.

Background
Despite the collapse of the Imperial-Spanish army under Alfonso d'Avalos at the Battle of Ceresole (Spanish: Cerisoles), the battle proved to be of little strategic significance. At the insistence of Francis I of France, the French army resumed the Siege of Carignano, where Pirro Colonna held out for several weeks. Soon after the city's surrender, the impending invasion of France itself by the forces of the Emperor Charles and Henry VIII of England, forced Francis to recall much of his army from Piedmont, leaving the Count of Enghien without the troops he needed to take Milan.

The Spaniards, holding all the strong places of Lombardy, were enabled to prevent d'Enghien from any further success.

The battle

Pietro Strozzi, an Italian military leader in French service, who had collected an army of over 10,000 soldiers at Mirandola, advanced boldly to Milan, in the hopes of joining d'Enghien there, but on 2–4 June, the Imperial-Spanish army commanded by Don Alfonso d'Avalos intercepted and defeated the Franco-Italian army of Pietro Strozzi and the Count of Pitigliano. The Strozzi's army was destroyed and the Spaniards obtained the total control of the Lombardy, ending the French offensive of the François de Bourbon, Count of Enghien, to try to capture the Duchy of Milan.

The brilliant French victory at Ceresole occurred two months earlier, finally resulted useless.

Consequences
The Milanese would remain in the hands of the Emperor Charles, and in the end of the war saw a return to the status-quo in northern Italy. In May, the Emperor invaded France with two armies. One of them, led by the Imperial commander Ferrante Gonzaga, Viceroy of Sicily, captured Luxembourg and moved towards Commercy and Ligny. On 8 July, Ferrante Gonzaga besieged Saint-Dizier, and the second army led by the Emperor Charles stationed in the Electorate of the Palatinate, soon joined him.

Meanwhile, Henry VIII, had sent an army of some 40,000 men to Calais under the command of Thomas Howard, Duke of Norfolk, and Charles Brandon, Duke of Suffolk.

See also
List of battles of the Italian Wars
Siege of St. Dizier
Sieges of Boulogne (1544–1546)
Italian Wars

Notes

References
 Scotto, Andrea. Serravalle, 4 giugno 1544. La Battaglia dimenticata e la conclusione delle Guerre d'Italia. Genoa: Erga Edizioni, 2009
Blockmans, Wim. Emperor Charles V (1500–1558). Translated by Isola van den Hoven-Vardon. New York: Oxford University Press (2002) .
Oman, Charles. A History of the Art of War in the Sixteenth Century. London: Methuen & Co. (1937)
 Modesto Lafuente. Historia General de España (Volume 12) 
Denieul-Cormier, Anne. The Renaissance in France. Trans. Anne and Christopher Fremantle. London: George Allen and Unwin Ltd 1969.
Black, Jeremy. "Dynasty Forged by Fire" MHQ: The Quarterly Journal of Military History 18, no. 3 (Spring 2006): 34–43. ISSN 1040-5992.
Stanley Leathes. The Cambridge Modern History. The Reformation: The end of the Middle Ages Chapter 2–3 (I) (II) Habsburg and Valois (1903)
Knecht, Robert J. Renaissance Warrior and Patron: The Reign of Francis I. Cambridge: Cambridge University Press (1994) .

1544 in France
1544 in Italy
1544 in Spain
Conflicts in 1544
Battles of the Italian Wars
Battles involving France
Battles involving the Holy Roman Empire
Battles involving Spain
Italian War of 1542–1546